Dismal River National Forest was established as the Dismal River Forest Reserve by the General Land Office in Nebraska on April 16, 1902  with .  After the transfer of federal forests to the U.S. Forest Service in 1905, it became a National Forest on March 4, 1907. On July 1, 1908 the lands were transferred to Nebraska National Forest.

References

External links
Forest History Society
Listing of the National Forests of the United States and Their Dates (from the Forest History Society website) Text from Davis, Richard C., ed. Encyclopedia of American Forest and Conservation History. New York: Macmillan Publishing Company for the Forest History Society, 1983. Vol. II, pp. 743-788.

Former National Forests of Nebraska
1902 establishments in Nebraska
1908 disestablishments in Nebraska
Protected areas established in 1902
Protected areas disestablished in 1908